The Mudan River is a river in Heilongjiang province in China. It is a right tributary of the Sunggari River.

Its modern Chinese name can be translated as the "Peony River". In the past it was also known as the Hurka or Hurha River.

The river flows into Lake Jingpo, and then continues north, flowing by Ning'an and Mudanjiang City (which is named after the river), then into Lianhua Reservoir before falling into the Sungari River at Yilan (formerly known as Sanxing).

Rivers of Heilongjiang
Rivers of Jilin
Geography of Yanbian